Myrsine fosbergii, the Koolau Range colicwood, is a species of plant in the family Primulaceae. It is endemic to the Hawaiian Islands. It is threatened by habitat loss.

References

fosbergii
Endemic flora of Hawaii
Trees of Hawaii
Taxonomy articles created by Polbot